Banayem (also Romanized as Banāyem and Banā'em) is a village in Gavdul-e Sharqi Rural District, in the Central District of Malekan County, East Azerbaijan Province, Iran. At the 2006 census, its population was 309, in 81 families.

References 

Populated places in Malekan County